Międzyzdroje, historically known as Misdroy in English, is a city and a seaside resort in northwestern Poland on the island of Wolin on the Baltic coast. The city is located in the West Pomeranian Voivodeship, and is a seat of the Kamień County and the municipality of Międzyzdroje. In 2016, it was inhabited by around 5,500 people. 

The town is often referred to as The Pearl of the Baltic. It is situated between wide sandy beaches with high cliffs and the forests of the Woliński National Park (which includes a bison reserve). Międzyzdroje has a spa climate and is rich in tourist services.

History
Towards the very end of the 12th century two settled camps or settlements have been established within the present-day borders of the town. Both of these settlements, with a mining and agricultural focus, were property of the bishopric of Kamień Pomorski. The first initial name of the town appeared in the 15th century as Misdroige. According to sources, the early Slavic and Germanic settlers were involved primarily in agriculture, cattle-breeding, fishing, bee-keeping and hunting.

The entire island of Wolin, including Międzyzdroje, was captured by the Swedish Empire in 1630 during the Thirty Years' War. Sweden ceded control of the island to Prussia in the 1720 Treaties of Stockholm. A particularly noticeable increase in the number of inhabitants, mostly local but also foreign, was recorded throughout the 18th century. During this time, the village began to evolve into a luxurious spa resort as a result of strong English influence in the development of sea baths.

In the first half of the industrial 19th century, Europeans of different backgrounds began to visit Misdroy and appreciate its baths, health clinics and favourable climate. With the arrival of tourists and the development of the tourist sector in the area, the once small, insignificant fishing village rapidly transformed into a popular health resort. In 1835, the gender-segregated baths were constructed by English and German merchants and entrepreneurs. Wealthy industrialists and business magnates from Stettin (Szczecin), Berlin and London would erect their magnificent and extravagant villas along the Baltic shore.

One of the earliest public parks was created in 1860 as an initiative of a wealthy Belgian merchant named Arnold Lejeune. A wooden pier on the Baltic Sea was constructed and eventually upgraded in 1906. The pier was 360 metres in length and the coffee-house situated at its very end still operates to this day.

In 1899, Misdroy was connected via railway with nearby Szczecin (Stettin) and Świnoujście, which contributed to an even greater number of patient and tourist arrivals. Shortly before the outbreak of World War I, over 20,000 visitors were recorded, an astonishing and record-breaking number in that period.

20th century
Prior to World War II, Misdroy had around 4,000 permanent residents. It did not suffer destruction during the course of the war. After the shifting of Poland's in accordance with the Potsdam Agreement, Międzyzdroje became part of the Polish People's Republic in 1945 and was granted town status.

The town's Polish name comes from its original 16th century meaning of the "town between salts springs", or Międzyzdroje in Polish.

International relations

Międzyzdroje was the birthplace of the Harvard World Model United Nations Conference in 1991.

Międzyzdroje is twinned with:

 Bakhchysarai Raion, Ukraine 
 Čačak, Serbia
 Helsingborg, Sweden
 Izola, Slovenia
 Lomma, Sweden
 Sellin, Germany

Notable residents
 Ernst Eiselen (1792 - 1846 in Misdroy), German gymnast and a promoter of the Jahn style of gymnastics 
 Hermann Wilhelm Ebel (1820 – 1875 in Misdroy), German philologist 
 Albert Sauer (1898–1945), German Nazi SS concentration camp commandant
 Prince Claus of the Netherlands (1926–2002), husband of Queen Beatrix, he attended the Baltenschule Misdroy from 1938 until 1942
 Grischa Huber (1944–2021), German actress
 Wiesław Chmielewski (born 1957), Polish modern pentathlete

External links

 Międzyzdroje (pl). Official website.

References

Spa towns in Poland
Cities and towns in West Pomeranian Voivodeship
Kamień County